The history of the Jews in Gibraltar dates back more than 650 years. There have been periods of persecution, but for the most part the Jews of Gibraltar have prospered and been one of the largest religious minorities in the city, where they have made contributions to the culture, defence, and Government of Gibraltar.

Significantly, the Jews of Gibraltar have faced almost no official anti-Semitism during their time in the city. During Gibraltar's tercentenary celebration, Jonathan Sacks, the Chief Rabbi of the United Kingdom of Great Britain and Northern Ireland and Commonwealth, was quoted as saying, "In the dark times of expulsion and inquisition, Gibraltar lit the beacon of tolerance," and that Gibraltar "is probably the community where Jews have been the most integrated."

History

Early history to 1492
The first record of Jews in Gibraltar comes from the year 1356, under Muslim rule, when the community issued an appeal asking for the ransom of a group of Jews taken captive by barbary pirates. In 1474, twelve years after the Christian takeover, the Duke of Medina Sidonia, sold Gibraltar to a group of Jewish conversos from Cordova and Seville led by Pedro de Herrera in exchange for maintaining the garrison of the town for two years, after which time the 4,350 Jews were expelled by the Duke. Their fate is unknown. It is likely that many returned to Cordova where they had to face the persecution of the Inquisition under the infamous Torquemada from 1488.

Jews were expelled from Spain under the Alhambra decree of 1492 and from Portugal by order of King Manuel I in 1497, effectively ending all Jewish activity there, except in the cases of conversos or possible Crypto-Jews.

British rule

After the Treaty of Utrecht in 1713, Gibraltar came under the rule of the Kingdom of Great Britain, which made the area a British dependency. In the Treaty, the Spanish added the following clause barring Jews and Moors from the city:

However, the British ignored this provision. Although the Jews had been expelled from England in 1290, Oliver Cromwell had consented to their readmission in 1655. The admission of Jews was one of the infractions against the Treaty of Utrecht that the Spanish used (others were the admission of Moors, the extension of fortifications and the alleged smuggling from Gibraltar) to consider that the British had abrogated the Treaty.  In 1727, the Spanish unsuccessfully laid siege to the city. In 1729, the British and the Sultan of Morocco reached an agreement whereby the sultan's Jewish subjects were legally permitted to reside in the colony. Jews were given the right to permanent settlement in 1749, when Isaac Nieto, the new community's first Rabbi, came to the colony from London and established congregation Sha'ar HaShamayim, the oldest synagogue in Gibraltar, otherwise known as the Great Synagogue. At that date there were already 600 Jews in Gibraltar, who constituted one third of the civilian population. Three more synagogues, all of which still function on Shabbat and feast days, were built as years went by: Nefutsot Yehuda and Ets Hayim in 1781, as well as the Abudarham Synagogue in 1820, named after Solomon Abudarham. The Jewish population continued to grow, reaching its peak in the mid-19th century.

The Jews of Gibraltar initially preserved some old customs. For example, in 1777, Issac Aboab, a Gibraltarian Jew born in Tetuan, was listed as having two wives, Hannah Aboab and Simah Aboab. Bigamy was illegal in the Kingdom of Great Britain at the time, but the law was apparently not fully operative in Gibraltar, and though polygamy had been banned by Rabbenu Gershom Meor Hagola since approximately 1000 CE, this ban was only accepted by Ashkenazi communities.

Twentieth century and today

Tito Benady, a historian on Gibraltar Jewry, noted that when some 200 Jews of the 2000 evacuees from Gibraltar were evacuated as non combatants to Funchal, Madeira, at the start of World War II, they found a Jewish cemetery (Jewish Cemetery of Funchal) that belonged to the Abudarham family. The same family after whom the Abudarham Synagogue in Gibraltar was named.

On the 28 May 1944 the first repatriation party departed Madeira for Gibraltar and by the end of 1944 only 520 non-priority evacuees remained on the island.

In 2008, a monument was made in Gibraltar and shipped to Madeira, where it has been erected next to a small chapel at Santa Caterina park, Funchal. The monument is a gift and symbol of ever-lasting thanks given by the people of Gibraltar to the island of Madeira and its inhabitants.

The city of Funchal and Gibraltar were twinned on 13 May 2009 by their then Mayors, the Mayor of Funchal Miguel Albuquerque and the Mayor of Gibraltar who had been an Evacuee from Gibraltar to Madeira Solomon Levy, respectively. The Mayor of Gibraltar then had a meeting with the then President of Madeira Alberto João Jardim.

Most of Gibraltar's Jews were evacuated to the United Kingdom during the Second World War, when the Allies used Gibraltar as a base of operations. Some Jews opted to stay in the United Kingdom, but most returned, although there was a slackening in some of their religious practices. The efforts of the Spanish sephardic Italian born Rabbi Josef Pacifici, who assumed the Gibraltar rabbinate and took control of Jewish education in Gibraltar, helped reverse this tendency. In 1984 Rabbi Ron Hassid became Chief Rabbi.

Several Gibraltarian Jews have served in important positions in the Government there in the 20th century, particularly Sir Joshua Hassan, who served as Chief Minister of Gibraltar for two separate terms. Solomon Levy served in the ceremonial role of Mayor of Gibraltar from 2008 to 2009. The city maintains five kosher institutions, a Jewish primary school and two Jewish secondary schools. In 2004, at a celebration of the 300 years since the British takeover, the congregants at the Great Synagogue (Shaar Hashamayim) performed the anthem "God Save the Queen" in Hebrew, the first time that has occurred officially.

Historical demographics
In 1753, when the first census was taken, the Jewish population of Gibraltar was 575 out of about 1,800 civilian inhabitants. The count had risen to 863 by 1777. In 1787 the population had fallen to 776. By 1830 the civilian population was evaluated to 1,900, of which 1,300 were "native" Jews and 600 recent Jewish immigrants, and by 1878 the community counted 1,533 members.

In 2001, there were 584 Jews (roughly 2% of the total population), of whom 464 were self-described Gibraltarian, 63 were "Other British", 4 were Moroccan and 18 Spanish. Five Jews came from other European Union countries, and 39 did not hail from Gibraltar, the United Kingdom, Morocco, Spain, or any other countries in the European Union. Presently a large percentage of Gibraltar's Jews are Sephardic, but there are a number of British Jews as well.

Language
Languages spoken in the Jewish community include English, Spanish, Ladino (spoken by the large Sephardic population) and Arabic (traditionally spoken by some of the population which traces its origins back to Morocco).

Llanito, the vernacular language for the majority of Gibraltarians, has significant Jewish influence. Some 500 words are of Hebrew origin, and the language also has features of influence from Haketia, a Judeo-Spanish language spoken by the Sephardic communities of Northern Morocco and the Spanish exclaves of Ceuta and Melilla.

See also
 Synagogues of Gibraltar
 Jews' Gate Cemetery

References

Further reading
Haller, Dieter. "Place and Ethnicity in Two Merchant Diasporas: a Comparison of the Sindhis and the Jews of Gibraltar". Global networks: a journal of transnational affairs 2003, Vol 3. No 1: 75–96

External links
 Gibraltar Jewish Community
Government of Gibraltar
Jewish Encyclopedia
Jewish Virtual Library: Gibraltar
Jewish Gibraltar
Jewish Europe – Gibraltar
The Jewish Community of Gibraltar, The Museum of the Jewish People at Beit Hatfutsot
Gibraltar 2001 Census
Llanito